Catch were an English indie pop band consisting of singer/keyboardist Toby Slater, bassist Wayne Murray and guitarist Ben Etchells. The band were signed to Virgin Records and released two singles - "Bingo", which reached No. 23 on the UK Singles Chart, and "Dive In", which reached No. 44. The band released one self-titled album, which was only issued in Indonesia.

History
Catch were formed from the ashes of Toby Slater's first band Brattish, who were active in 1994/95. The band featured bass guitarist and backing vocalist Matthew Harding, who was briefly a member of Catch, but reputedly left when Slater refused to give him a writing credit. Brattish rehearsed the Catch material extensively, paid for by interested A&R men, but never gigged. Slater also was a driving-force behind the Romo movement, DJing at Soho's Arcadia at L'Equippe Anglais and Madame Jojo's in the autumn/winter of 1995. Melody Maker reported that an eleven track demo tape of Brattish, featuring a heavily synth/electro sound, was circulating among an elite handful at Arcadia/Club Skinny at the time.

The release of debut single "Bingo" saw the band appearing on Top of the Pops, Light Lunch, The Paul Ross Show (performing three songs live), The Jack Docherty Show and various Saturday morning UK TV shows. "Bingo" was also being shown on the ITV Chart Show when ITN interrupted programming to report on the death of Diana, Princess of Wales in 1997. Slater also presented some shows on MTV around this time. 

The band's debut album was rush released in Indonesia due to the band's sudden popularity there, and they visited Jakarta for a promotional tour and performed acoustically for fans. 

The album was delayed in the UK due to Slater being unhappy with it at the time, however the band split up prior to it being released in any form in the UK. A working title was believed to have been Victim Support.

Post-split

Following the split of Catch, Slater moved to Los Angeles and began pursuing a solo career. Returning to London, he formed a group featuring former members of the UK band Salamanda, and began recording and gigging, under his own name. The Toby Slater Band released one single, "Consumption", and other songs that were made available online via Slater's own website and via the fledgling Napster file sharing service, on which Slater was a featured artist during August 2000. 

Slater had written, recorded and released music with a band, initially under the name Kunta Kinte and subsequently as Tough Love. He was also involved in the White Mischief series of steampunk entertainment events based predominantly in London.

Wayne Murray is now a touring guitarist for the Manic Street Preachers and fronts a music project named Boy Cried Wolf. Ben Etchells is a sound engineer at Live Sound Training.

Toby Slater died on 13 December 2021 at the age of 42.

Discography

Albums
 Catch (Indonesian only release, 1997, now out of print)

Singles
 "Bingo" (September 1997) - UK #23
 "Dive In" (February 1998) - UK #44

List of Catch songs
 "Bingo" 
 "Dive In" 
 "Half the World Away"
 "A New Soul"
 "Don't Wait Up"
 "Pity the Man"
 "My Burst Balloon"
 "Expensive Kiss"
 "Goodbye"
 "Start of Something"
 "Over Again"
 "Maybe Tonight"

B-sides
 "Boys Will Be Boys"
 "Bitten by You"
 "The Better Me"
 "Simon Says"
 "Pullover Boy"
 "No-One Knows"
 "The Possibilities"
 "Morning Sun"

Known demos
 "Blue Room"
 "Under the Bed"
 "Victorian Names"
 "Paper Aeroplanes"
 "The Worst Years"
 "My Bright Child"
 "Second to None"

See also
 Toby Slater

References

https://www.riotactpodcast.com/70-the-anal-timekeeper/

External Links
 
 

1997 establishments in England
1999 disestablishments in England
British indie pop groups
Musical groups established in 1997
Musical groups disestablished in 1999
English alternative rock groups
Britpop groups
British musical trios
Virgin Records artists